The Game Boy portable system has a library of games, which were released in plastic ROM cartridges. The Game Boy first launched in Japan on April 21, 1989, with Super Mario Land, Alleyway, Baseball and Yakuman. For the North American launches, Tetris and Tennis were also featured, while Yakuman was never released outside of Japan. The last games to be published for the system were the Japan-only titles Shikakei Atama o Kore Kusuru: Kanji no Tatsujin and Shikakei Atama o Kore Kusuru: Keisan no Tatsujin, which were both released on March 30, 2001. This list is initially organized alphabetically by their English titles, or, when Japan-exclusive, their rōmaji transliterations; however, it is also possible to sort each column individually by clicking the square icon at the top of each column. The Game Boy system is not region locked, meaning that software purchased in any region can be played on any region's hardware. For Game Boy Color cartridges compatible with the original Game Boy, see those indicated in List of Game Boy Color games.

List of games
This is a sortable list of  games released for the Game Boy handheld video game system, excluding any cancelled and unlicensed games.

Bundle compilations

Cancelled games

Unlicensed games

See also
Lists of video games
List of Game Boy Color games
List of Game Boy Advance games
List of multiplayer Game Boy games
List of Super Game Boy games
List of Nintendo DS games
List of Nintendo 3DS games
List of Virtual Console games for Nintendo 3DS (Japan)
List of Virtual Console games for Nintendo 3DS (North America)
List of Virtual Console games for Nintendo 3DS (PAL region)

References
Game Boy (original) games list at Nintendo.com

Game Boy
Game Boy